Northeim is an unincorporated community located in the town of Newton, Manitowoc County, Wisconsin, United States.

Notable locals 
Fred. "Fritz" Schmitz, farmer, musician and member of the Wisconsin State Assembly

References

Unincorporated communities in Manitowoc County, Wisconsin
Unincorporated communities in Wisconsin